{{Infobox university 
| name                  = University of Negros Occidental – Recoletos
| native_name           = Pamantasan ng Negros Occidental – Rekoletos| image                 = UNO-R logo.png
| image_size            = 175px
| caption               = Seal of the University of Negros Occidental - Recoletos
| former_names          =
| motto                 = Caritas et Scientia 
| mottoeng              = Love and Knowledge| type                  =  Private, Roman Catholic, Research, coeducational basic and higher education institution
| established           = 
| founders              = Dr. Antonio A. LizaresDr. Francisco Kilayko 
| religious_affiliation = Roman Catholic (Augustinian Recollects)
| academic_affiliations = PAASCU and PACUCOA
| president             = Rev. Fr. Joel A. Alve, OAR
| vice-president        =  
| director              = 
| dean = 
| administrative_staff  = Approximately 500
| city                  = 51 Lizares Ave., Bacolod
| province              = Negros Occidental
| country               = Philippines 
| endowment             = 
| campus                = Urban, 
| free_label1            = Alma Mater song
| free1                  = UNO-R Alma Mater Hymn  The Blue and the Gold March| free_label2            = Patron saint 
| free2                  = Saint Nicholas of Tolentino
| colors                =  and 
| nickname              =  UNO-Rians
| athletics             = 
| sporting_affiliations = NOPSSCEA
| mascot                = Golden Ram  
| website               = 
| logo                  = 
| logo_size             = 
|}}

The University of Negros Occidental – Recoletos (UNO-Recoletos, colloquially UNO-R), is a private, Catholic coeducational basic and higher education institution administered by the Order of Augustinian Recollects in Bacolod, Negros Occidental, Philippines. It was founded in 1941.

All six colleges and Integrated School departments (N-10 and Grades 11 and 12) of UNO-Recoletos are undergoing accreditation from the Philippines Accrediting Association of Schools, Colleges and Universities (PAASCU). The Recoeltos de Bacolod Graduate School (RBGS) is undergoing accreditation from PACUCOA.  Moreover, Department of Computer Studies is recognized by the Commission on Higher Education (CHED) the distinction as Center of Development and Excellence.

Additionally, CHED, through the Institutional Development and Innovation Grant (IDIG) proposals, funded an e-Learning initiative for agriculture education project in the institution. The project is called the Recoletos Online Learning Extension and administered by the Agriculture Program under the College of Arts and Sciences.

History

The University of Negros Occidental – Recoletos was founded in 1941 in Talisay, Negros Occidental by Dr. Antonio A. Lizares and Dr. Francisco Kilayko. Then known as Occidental Negros Institute, the school offered first and second years of high school education. Upon the outbreak of World War II in the Philippines in December of that same year, the institute closed temporarily.Occidental Negros Institute was re-established in Bacolod in 1946, this time offering elementary, high school and three tertiary degree programs. The campus transferred from Locsin street (formerly Smith Street) to Lupit Subdivision in Lizares Avenue, its present site, in 1950. Dr. Antonio Lizares served as the school's first President with Dr. Francisco Kilayko as the School Director.

On May 15, 1957, ONI was elevated to university status by the Acting Secretary of Education, Martin V. Aguilar, Jr. ONI became the University of Negros Occidental, the first university in the province. Five years later, on May 25, 1962, UNO was acquired by the Augustinian Recollect friars. UNO became the University of Negros Occidental-Recoletos with Fr. Federico Terradillos, OAR, as the first acting Rector.

As of August 31, 2022, Reverend Fr. Joel A. Alve was appointed as the University's 18th president.

Academics
UNO-R offers pre-school, Grade school, Junior High School, and Senior High School through its Integrated School, as well as diploma programs, undergraduate and graduate level programs. As of 2021, it has six academic colleges namely:College of Arts and Sciences College of Accountancy, Business and Computer Studies College of EngineeringCollege of Criminal Justice EducationCollege of EducationCollege of Allied Medical Health SciencesUNO-R also has a School of Law and a graduate school named the Recoletos de Bacolod Graduate School. UNO-R also offers TESDA-accredited courses under the Recoletos Industrial and Technology Training Center (RITTC).

Patron saint

The University's patron saint is Nicholas of Tolentino. Saint Nicholas of Tolentino, known as the Patron of Holy Souls, was born at Sant' Angelo, near Fermo, in Italy in the March of Ancona, around 1246. His parents, Compagnonus de Guarutti and Amata de Guidiani, were originally unable to have a child, but after praying at a shrine of St. Nicholas of Myra, Amata became pregnant, and they named their son after the saint.

The University's official student publication, the Tolentine Star, established in 1947, pays homage to the saint.

 OAR schools in the Philippines 
 University of San Jose–Recoletos (Cebu City)
 San Sebastian College–Recoletos (Manila)
 San Sebastian College–Recoletos de Manila, Canlubang satellite campus (Calamba, Laguna)
 San Sebastian College–Recoletos de Cavite
 Colegio de Santo Tomas – Recoletos (San Carlos City, Negros Occidental)
 Colegio San Nicolas de Tolentino–Recoletos (formerly UNO-R High School Talisay Branch) (Talisay City, Negros Occidental)
 Colegio de San Pedro Academy–Recoletos (Poblacion, Valencia, Negros Oriental)
 San Pedro Academy–Recoletos (Caidiocan, Valencia, Negros Oriental)

Seminary and Formation Houses
 Santo Tomas de Villanueva Recoletos Formation House (High School) (San Carlos City, Negros Occidental)
 Casiciaco Recoletos Seminary (formerly Seminario Mayor - Recoletos de Baguio) (Philosophy) (Baguio)
 Recoletos Formation Center (Theology'') (Mira-Nila Homes, Quezon City)

See also
Augustinians
Augustinian Recollects
Bridgittines
List of tertiary schools in Bacolod City
Order of the Canons Regular of Premontre
Society of Saint Augustine

Gallery

References

External links
Official website
Order of Augustinian Recollects - Province of St. Ezekiel Moreno Website
International Order of St. Augustine
Text of the Rule of St. Augustine
The Society of Saint Augustine (S.S.A.)  Societas Sancti Augustini
 

Augustinian schools
Augustinian universities and colleges
Educational institutions established in 1941
Universities and colleges in Bacolod
Schools in Bacolod
Catholic universities and colleges in the Philippines
Catholic secondary schools in the Philippines
Catholic elementary schools in the Philippines
1941 establishments in the Philippines